Tom D’Eath is an American hydroplane and racecar driver
from Michigan.

Career summary
Tom D'Eath (pronounced deeth) won three American Power Boat Association Gold Cups and three the Prince Edward Canadian Gold Cups. He remains the only three-time winner of both.  He has also won National Championships in virtually every other class of hydroplane racing.   D'Eath also competed on land, by driving in the USAC Formula Vees from 1977 to 1981 and midget cars from 1982 through his retirement from racing in 1991.

Arguably his most memorable victory was in the bicentennial 1976 APBA Gold Cup unlimited hydroplane race, held on the Detroit River. D'Eath piloted the Miss US to a narrow upset victory over Bill Muncey in the Atlas Van Lines, a hull that won the two previous Gold Cups and the three previous APBA National Championships. In addition to being D'Eath's first Gold Cup win, it was the first Gold Cup win for a turbocharged V-12 Allison aircraft engine, the first for a cabover unlimited hull, and the first Gold Cup win for Miss US owner George Simon, who had competed in unlimited hydroplane racing since 1953.

In 1994 Tom became the first Chairman of the Vintage and Historic Division of APBA.

Awards
He was inducted into the Motorsports Hall of Fame of America in 2000. 
D'Eath was inducted into the National Polish-American Sports Hall of Fame on June 23, 2011, in Troy, Michigan.

Racing record

Complete USAC Mini-Indy Series results

References

External links
APBA Official website
APBA Vintage Official website

American motorboat racers
Living people
APBA Challenge Cup
American people of Polish descent
Racing drivers from Michigan
Year of birth missing (living people)